Cormac McCarthy is the American author (born 1930s).

Cormac McCarthy also may refer to:
 Other Americans:
 Cormac McCarthy (musician) (born c. 1950)
 Line of and from ancient Irish leaders:
 Cormac mac Airt (fl. 2nd, 3rd, or 4th cen.)
 Cormac Laidir MacCarthy, Lord of Muscry and in 1446 re-builder of Blarney Castle
 Various monarchs of Desmond, and claimants to that line, in 12th to 21st centuries